Sandalinas is a Spanish/Swedish progressive metal band founded in 2001 by guitarist Jordi Sandalinas, featuring Rick Altzi on vocals (also with Masterplan and At Vance). Apollo Papathanasio, ex-Firewind and Spiritual Beggars sang on the band's debut album called Living on the Edge. Their first album, Living on the Edge, was produced by Andy LaRocque and released in 2005.

Biography
Sandalinas' first EP, Like an Arrow, was released in 2001 and a single, "Die Hard", followed in 2002. The following year, Sandalinas contacted Andy LaRocque, guitarist of King Diamond, because he was interested in recording an album at his studio located near Gothenburg. The album, called Living on the Edge, was recorded in 2004 and released in 2005 by German label Massacre Records in Europe, Canada and Australia, and later by Nightmare Records for the United States and Art Music for Russia. A European tour supporting Cornerstone and dates supporting Sebastian Bach, former Skid Row singer, and Steven Adler, former Guns N' Roses drummer, were cancelled due to personal reasons. A few months later Sandalinas supported Y&T, Yngwie Malmsteen and Scorpions on a major and successful Spanish tour.

Sandalinas' second release, Fly to the Sun, started in West Palm Beach, Florida, USA, in December 2006, at the Barn's Studio Facilities (Florida, USA) where Jordi and Patrick Johansson set up the first stone of this album by recording all drum files following the precise instructions and guidelines of Andy LaRocque. Rhythm guitars and keyboards were tracked down at Los Angered Studio recording facilities by Jordi Sandalinas (guitars) and Elias Holmlid (keyboards), and following that, Mick Cervino recorded the bass parts at Liquid Ghost Studio in Boca Raton, Florida. Derek Sherinian recorded the keyboard parts for "Seasons in the Sand" in Burbank, California, at the Beachwood Manor Studios followed by well-known engineer Matt Flinker. Jordi and Derek entered into an excellent crossed solo that turned a great song into a magnificent state-of-the-art creation. Chris Caffery, Jordi Sandalinas and Andy LaRocque were the very last artists to record at the former Los Angered Recording Studios, actually moved to Sonic Train Studios in Sweden. Chris recorded two solos for "Shadows in the Rain" and "Double Cross" and Andy LaRocque did the same part for the song "The Healer Talks".

Jordi Sandalinas has been the first artist to record at Sonic Train Studios. Jordi used ten different guitars including five electric guitars and different models of six- and twelve-string acoustic guitars for the album.  Andy LaRocque took over the mixing and the mastering process. Despite names such as Andy Horn were pointed as possible mastering maestro, Andy finally mastered Sandalinas' Fly to the Sun.

In February 2012 Sandalinas went on tour supporting House of Lords in Europe on a trip that covered 17 shows in 19 days. Sweden, the Netherlands, Belgium, Germany, Hungary and Switzerland were some of the countries that the band visited. The live line-up was Rick Altzi (vocals), Jordi Sandalinas (lead guitars), Agus Gonzalez-Lancharro (rhythm guitars), Julian Langer (bass) and Alex Landenburg (drums); the latter substituted Mats and Alvaro.

In August 2012, Sandalinas planned to conclude the recording of the third album called Circles again at Sonic Train studios in Sweden. Andy LaRocque and Chris Caffery from Savatage and Trans-Siberian Orchestra have contributed with the composition of one and two songs respectively.

New plans to release two new albums have been confirmed: Circles (band album) and The Ocean Messiah (solo album). The latest forms part of a trilogy jointly with the album Songs for the New Lemuria and a book to be released during 2020 and 2021.

Members
Jordi Sandalinas – guitars and backing vocals
Rick Altzi – vocals
Alvaro Svanerö – drums
Mats Rendlert – bass

Former members
Apollo Papathanasio – vocals
Marcus Palsson – keyboards
Ludwig Witt – drums

Discography

EPs and Singles
Like an Arrow - EP (2001) out of print 
Die Hard - EP (2002) out of print 
No Matter What: A tribute to Japan (2011) 
Power to the People, The Raw E.P (2013) 
Aquell Estiu, EP  Digital (2013) 
22 Strings the Invisible EP (2017) 
I tried. Digital single (2018)
Al teu costat. Digital single (2020)

Full albums
Living on the Edge (2005) 
Fly to the Sun (2008) 
Insight: Acoustic Rare and Unreleased Tracks (2009). Solo Album 
Sons of Orion (2016) 
Sons of Orion - Double Studio and live CD (2017) 
Songs for the New Lemuria (2020) 
Circles - (2021) 
The Ocean Messiah - (2021) (solo album)

Compilations
No Matter What: CD Metal Hammer Magazine Spain (2012)

External links
Official website
Official website of Jordi Sandalinas
Sandalinas at MySpace

Musical groups established in 2001
Spanish heavy metal musical groups